X-ray nanochemistry is a discipline that studies how to use newly developed nanomaterials to improve the effectiveness of X-ray radiation. X-ray nanochemistry therefore includes many components such as nanomaterials synthesis, physical and chemical principles governing the ways of improvement, and applications of these improvements.  X-ray nanochemistry was first mentioned by Guo et al. (Davidson et al., 2012). X-ray nanochemistry is more fully defined in the book of “X-ray Nanochemistry: Concepts and Development,” which is the first book about this new discipline.
X-ray nanochemistry is interfaced with many fields and applications such as kinetics and dynamics, X-ray spectroscopy, nanochemistry, catalysis, radiotherapy, radiation chemistry, photodynamic therapy, environmental science, sensing, batteries, high resolution invisible inks, X-ray driven signaling, biology, and many other fields and disciplines.

References 

Nanotechnology